The Scout and Guide movement in Mozambique is served by the following organisations:
 the Mozambique Guides, association "working towards WAGGGS membership"
 the Liga dos Escuteiros de Moçambique, member of the World Organization of the Scout Movement

See also